The 1933–34 Bradford City A.F.C. season was the 27th in the club's history.

The club finished 6th in Division Two, and reached the 3rd round of the FA Cup.

Sources

References

Bradford City A.F.C. seasons
Bradford City